The fleet escort Jauréguiberry was a French destroyer of the , designed for anti-air and (to a lesser extent) anti-submarine roles. She was the second French Navy vessel to bear the name.

Laid down in September 1954, the vessel was launched on 5 November 1955. Jauréguiberry was commissioned into the Marine Nationale on 15 July 1958 with the identification number D 637.

Service history
In 1966 and 1968, she was involved in two nuclear tests with "Force Alfa", and a third one in 1970 with the cruiser , in the Pacific Ocean. In 1974, she achieved a long mission with the frigate .

In the beginning of 1977, a few months before being decommissioned, she was used for the film "Le Crabe-Tambour" by Pierre Schoendoerffer. The ship was decommissioned 16 September 1977, its hull receiving No. Q580. It was then used as a target ship for testing an ARMAT anti-radar missile on 16 June 1982.

It was sunk on 30 May 1986 as a target during tests to test the Exocet MM40 missile.

Sources and references 
  Escorteur d'Escadre Jauréguiberry, netmarine.net

T 53-class destroyers
Cold War frigates of France
Ships built in France
1955 ships
Destroyers of the Cold War